The 2008 Africa Cup of Nations Final was a football match that took place on 10 February 2008 at the Ohene Djan Stadium in Accra, Ghana to determine the winner of the 2008 Africa Cup of Nations, the football championship of African national teams organised by the Confederation of African Football (CAF).

It was contested between Cameroon and Egypt. Egypt defeated Cameroon 0–1 to win their sixth title.

Details

References

Final
2008
2008
African
African
African
February 2008 sports events in Africa
21st century in Accra